Alicehead is a small area of settlement in Derbyshire, England,  south-west of Chesterfield. It consists of four farms and a cottage on Alicehead Road, close to the junction of Darley Road and the A632. The area contains  of upland heathland. The population of the settlement was only minimal at the 2011 Census. Details are included in the civil parish of Ashover.

References

Villages in Derbyshire
North East Derbyshire District